Brendan Kelly (born 1968) is an Irish retired hurler who played as a midfielder for the Offaly senior team.

Kelly joined the team during the 1986-87 National League and was a regular member of the starting fifteen for over a decade. During that time he won one All-Ireland winners' medal, three Leinster winners' medals and one National Hurling League winners' medal.

At club level Kelly is a one-time county club championship medalist with Lusmagh.

References

1968 births
Living people
Lusmagh hurlers
Offaly inter-county hurlers
All-Ireland Senior Hurling Championship winners